Saint-Léger-sur-Roanne (literally Saint-Léger on Roanne) is a commune in the Loire department in central France.

A football team called les Belettes (The Weasels) was created in the village in 2020. In April 2021 the village was the site of a large explosion after gas-cylinders were exposed to fire.

Population

See also
Communes of the Loire department

References

Communes of Loire (department)